The Kansas City Chiefs of the National Football League (NFL) have had 13 head coaches in their franchise history. The franchise was founded in 1960 by Lamar Hunt and were known as the Dallas Texans when the team was located in Dallas, Texas. The team relocated to Kansas City, Missouri and were renamed the Chiefs in 1963. The franchise was a charter member of the American Football League (AFL) before entering into the NFL following the AFL-NFL merger.

Hank Stram, the team's first head coach, led the Chiefs to three AFL championship victories and two appearances in the Super Bowl. Stram was the team's longest-tenured head coach, holding the position from 1960 to 1974. Marty Schottenheimer was hired in 1989 and led Kansas City to seven playoff appearances in his ten seasons as head coach. Of the thirteen Chiefs coaches, Hank Stram, Marv Levy, and Dick Vermeil have been elected into the Pro Football Hall of Fame. Seven head coaches have led the Chiefs to the playoffs, of those seven, only three won a game in the playoffs. Romeo Crennel, who coached the team for three games in 2011 and the entire 2012 season, is the team’s shortest tenured head coach. He was fired following what was statistically the worst season in franchise history in 2012. Andy Reid has been the head coach since 2013. Following the Chiefs' Super Bowl championship in the 2019 season, Reid became the franchise leader in playoff wins.

Key

Coaches
Note: Statistics are accurate through the end of the 2021 NFL season.

Notes

References
General

 Herb, Patrick, Kuhbander, Brad, Looney, Josh, and Moris, Pete, eds. 2008 Kansas City Chiefs Media Guide, Kansas City Chiefs Football Club, Inc., 2008
 
 

Specific

 
Kansas City Chiefs
Head coaches